Dirk Bikkembergs (born 2 January 1959) is a Belgian fashion designer.

Early life
Dirk Bikkembergs was born in Cologne, Germany, as his father was in the Belgian Army. He lived most of his years in Diepenbeek, Limburg, Belgium.  In 1982, Bikkembergs graduated from the Royal Academy of Fine Arts in Antwerp, Belgium.

Designer career
In 1996, the Bikkembergs label was introduced to focus on football dress. He was the first fashion designer ever who received permission to hold a fashion show in a football stadium.

Dirk started using the team as his laboratory for styling and fabric technology. From exclusive jackets to high-performance underwear, all his designs are now tested and promoted by football players. The Dirk Bikkembergs Group's sponsorship of the team, now re-christened F.C. Bikkembergs Fossombrone, involved not only investment to bring in fresh talent, but also a revamp of their image.

See also
 Antwerp Six
 List of fashion designers

References

External links
 Bikkembergs official site

VIDEO BY MILAN FASHION WEEK SS15 https://web.archive.org/web/20140716002031/http://hdfashion.net/ru/videoline/fashion-show/item/1888-dirk-bikkembergs-ss15

1959 births
Living people
People from Limburg (Belgium)
Belgian fashion designers
LGBT fashion designers
High fashion brands
Royal Academy of Fine Arts (Antwerp) alumni
Sportswear brands
21st-century Belgian LGBT people